Sammy Cohen (1902–1981) was an American film actor and comedian. He was one of several popular Jewish comedians acting in films during the late 1920s.

Selected filmography
 What Price Glory? (1926)
 The Return of Peter Grimm (1926)
 The Skyrocket (1926)
 The Great K & A Train Robbery (1926)
 Upstream (1927)
 Cradle Snatchers (1927)
 Colleen (1927)
 The Gay Retreat (1927)
 Why Sailors Go Wrong (1928)
 Homesick (1928)
 Plastered in Paris (1928)
 Sailor's Luck (1933)
 Swellhead (1935)
 Rip Roarin' Buckaroo (1936)
 Here Comes Trouble (1936)
 The Phantom of the Range (1936)
 45 Fathers (1937)
 Battle of Broadway (1938)
 The Fighting 69th (1940)
 You're the One (1941)

References

Bibliography
 Erens, Patricia. The Jew in American Cinema. Indiana University Press, 1984.

External links

1902 births
1981 deaths
American male film actors
Jewish American male actors
People from Minneapolis
20th-century American male actors
20th-century American Jews